Oberea pseudovaricornis is a species of beetle in the family Cerambycidae. It was described by Hunt and Stephan von Breuning in 1956.

References

Beetles described in 1956
pseudovaricornis